"Light One Candle" is a song by the folk group Peter, Paul and Mary. It is a popular Hanukkah song. Peter, Paul, and Mary performed the song in concerts starting in 1982, before recording it for their 1986 studio album No Easy Walk to Freedom.

The lyrics commemorate the war of national liberation fought by the Maccabees against the Seleucid Greek empire from 167 to 141 BCE, a war described in the Books of the Maccabees and commemorated by the Jewish holiday of Hanukkah.

History
The first performance of the song was at a 1982 concert in Carnegie Hall.

The song was written in 1982 by group member Peter Yarrow as a pacifist response to the 1982 Lebanon War, an intention was reflected in the lyrics "Light one candle for the terrible sacrifice justice and freedom demand, Light one candle for the wisdom to know when the peacemaker's time is at hand."

In 1983, when the trio performed the song at an outdoor concert in Jerusalem, a country torn over the Lebanon War, they added lyrics to address the political complexities faced by their audience: "Light one candle for the strength that we need to never become our own foe. Light one candle for those who are suffering, pain we learned so long ago. Light one candle for all we believe in, let anger not tear us apart. Light one candle to bind us together with peace as the song in our heart..." When they repeated the chorus "Don't let the light go out, It's lasted for so many years. Don't let the light go out, Let it shine through our love and our tears," the politically mixed audience cheered.

Critic Andew Silow-Carroll dismisses the lyrics, "Light one candle for the Maccabee children / With thanks their light didn’t die; / Light one candle for the pain they endured / When their right to exist was denied," as a boringly didactic history lesson.

References

Hanukkah music
Peter, Paul and Mary songs
1982 songs
Protest songs
Songs written by Peter Yarrow